Hayden Anthony Roy White (born 15 April 1995) is an English professional footballer who plays as a defender for League Two club Walsall.

Career

Bolton Wanderers
White came through the youth ranks at Sheffield Wednesday before he signed for Bolton Wanderers on 24 June 2013 after turning down a professional contract.

He made his professional debut against Queens Park Rangers at Loftus Road on 28 January 2014, coming on as a substitute for the injured Tim Ream in the fifth minute.

White made his first start for the club in their 1–0 loss to Leicester City on 22 April and made his first appearance of the 2014–15 Championship season coming on as a second half stoppage time substitute for the injured Kevin McNaughton with his only and the game's final touch in a 2–1 defeat to Middlesbrough in August 2014.

On 18 September 2014, White joined Carlisle United on a one-month emergency loan. On 18 October 2014 White extended his loan until 15 November 2014.

White's Carlisle United loan was cut short through suspension and on 7 November 2014 he joined Bury on loan until January. When that loan expired, he joined Notts County on 19 January 2015 for the rest of the season, but was recalled by Bolton Wanderers early.

On 19 October 2015, he joined Blackpool on loan until early January 2016. He Scored his first goal for the club opening the scoring in a 2–0 win v Crewe Alexandria on 24 October 2015 in his second appearance. He was named in the Football League Team of the Week in the first week he was with Blackpool.

At the end of the 2015–16 season, Bolton confirmed that he would be leaving when his contract expired at the end of June.

Peterborough United
On 16 May 2016, White joined Peterborough United on a two-year deal.

Mansfield Town
On 12 January 2017, White joined Mansfield Town on loan until the end of the 2016–17 season. He made his move to the Stags permanent in May 2017. He was released by Mansfield at the end of the 2019–20 season.

Walsall
On 3 September 2020, White signed for EFL League Two club Walsall F.C.

Career statistics

References

External links

1995 births
Living people
Footballers from Greenwich
English footballers
Association football defenders
Sheffield Wednesday F.C. players
Bolton Wanderers F.C. players
Carlisle United F.C. players
Bury F.C. players
Notts County F.C. players
Blackpool F.C. players
Peterborough United F.C. players
Mansfield Town F.C. players
Walsall F.C. players
English Football League players
Black British sportspeople